is an Autobahn in Germany connecting Gießen and Wetzlar. It is part of the abandoned A 48 planning.

Exit list 

 (provisorisch)

|}

External links 

480
A480
Buildings and structures in Wetzlar